The Manhattan Prong of the New England Uplands is a smaller belt of ancient rock in southern New York (including Manhattan, the Bronx, and segments of Brooklyn and Staten Island), parts of Westchester County, and upland portions of southwestern Connecticut.

The Manhattan Prong and the Reading Prong are separated by the Newark Basin in the south, but the two features merge at the northern terminus of the Newark Basin in the vicinity of Peekskill, New York. A band of mountains that rise nearly one thousand feet along the northwestern margin of the Newark Basin in New York and New Jersey are called the Ramapo Mountains. Another belt of ancient metamorphic and igneous rock crops out along the southern margin of the Newark Basin south and west of Trenton, New Jersey. In this region the rocks are referred to as part of the Trenton Prong.

This region includes Manhattan schist and Tuckahoe marble.

References

Geology of Connecticut
Geology of New York (state)
Appalachian Mountains
Landforms of Manhattan
Landforms of the Bronx